At least 38 people were killed and 86 others wounded, as a result of two car bombings, in Iraq's capital of Baghdad. The Islamic State of Iraq and the Levant claimed responsibility for the attack.

Bombing
On 30 April 2016, a car exploded in southeastern Baghdad, targeting Shia pilgrims that were walking to the Kadhimiyah shrine. It resulted in at least 38 deaths and 86 other wounded, according to local police officials. Other government security officials suggested the target was an open-air market.

See also
 2015–16 Iraqi protests
 List of terrorist incidents, January–June 2016
 Terrorist incidents in Iraq in 2016

References

2016 murders in Iraq
21st-century mass murder in Iraq
2010s in Baghdad
April 2016 crimes in Asia
April 2016 events in Iraq
Attacks on Shiite mosques
Suicide bombings in 2016
ISIL terrorist incidents in Iraq
Islamic terrorist incidents in 2016
Mass murder in 2016
Suicide bombings in Baghdad
Terrorist incidents in Baghdad
Terrorist incidents in Iraq in 2016
Mosque bombings by Islamists
Attacks on religious buildings and structures in Iraq
Mosque bombings in Asia